Lee Ji-hyun is a South Korean actress. She is known for her roles in dramas such as Thirty-Nine, She Would Never Know, Beautiful World and All of Us Are Dead. She also appeared in movies Solace, The Cat, If You Were Me and I'm a Cyborg, But That's OK.

Filmography

Television series

Web series

Film

Theater

Awards and nominations

References

External links 
 
 

1972 births
Living people
21st-century South Korean actresses
South Korean television actresses
South Korean film actresses